Craig Road (Chinese: 克力路) is a road located in Tanjong Pagar within the Outram Planning Area in Singapore. The road links Neil Road and Tanjong Pagar Road, and is also accessible via Duxton Road.

References
Victor R Savage, Brenda S A Yeoh (2004), Toponymics - A Study of Singapore Street Names, Eastern University Press, 

Roads in Singapore
Outram, Singapore
Tanjong Pagar